Niemiec is a Polish-language surname literally meaning "German person". Notable people with this surname include:

 Al Niemiec (1911–1995), American baseball player
 Bohuslav Niemiec (born 1982), Czech politician of Polish ethnicity
 Courtney Niemiec (born 1992), American soccer player
 Jan Niemiec (1958–2020), Polish-born Ukrainian Roman Catholic bishop
 Jan Niemiec (1941–2017), Polish canoeist
 John Niemiec (1901–1976), American footballer
 Franciszek Niemiec (born 1950), Polish basketball player
 Patryk Niemiec (born 1997), Polish volleyball player
 Przemysław Niemiec (born 1980), Polish cyclist
 Szymon Niemiec (born 1977), Polish free jurisdiction clergyman and gay activist
 Wojciech Niemiec (1956–2021), Polish footballer

Polish-language surnames
Ethnonymic surnames